KLUC-FM (98.5 MHz) is a legacy commercial radio station located in Las Vegas, Nevada.  KLUC airs a Top 40 (CHR) music format. Owned by Audacy, Inc., the station's studios are located in the unincorporated Clark County area of Spring Valley, while its transmitter is atop Black Mountain in Henderson.

History
Rainbow, Inc., owner of KRBO (1050 AM), obtained a construction permit for a new FM radio station in Las Vegas on March 22, 1961. The unbuilt station, originally dubbed KRBO-FM, was sold along with the AM station to Meyer (Mike) Gold the next year; Gold built it and signed it on as KLUC-FM in 1963. 

It was acquired by the KLUC Broadcasting Company in 1970. KLUC renamed itself Western Cities Broadcasting in 1979 to reflect its station holdings in Las Vegas; Tucson, Arizona; and Sacramento, California. Western Cities was able to make the Top 40 station a ratings and revenue leader in the late 1970s through the 1980s. Western Cities was acquired by Nationwide Communications in 1985.

KXNO (the former KRBO/KLUC AM) and KLUC-FM were sold in 1996 for $11 million to American Radio Systems of Boston, with Nationwide noting that Las Vegas did not fit its corporate strategy of concentrating on top-25 markets. The station continued to play a slightly broader mix than a typical Top 40; it was also the recognized primary commercial outlet for urban music in the city, playing more rap in the evenings. In 1998, American Radio Systems merged with CBS Radio.

On February 2, 2017, CBS Radio announced it would merge with Entercom. The merger was approved on November 9, 2017, and was consummated on November 17.

Former logos

References

External links

LUC
LUC
Contemporary hit radio stations in the United States
Radio stations established in 1963
1963 establishments in Nevada
Audacy, Inc. radio stations